A Christmas club is a special-purpose savings account, first offered by various banks and credit unions in the United States beginning in early 20th century, including the Great Depression, under which bank customers deposit a set amount of money each week into a savings account, and receive the money back at the end of the year for Christmas shopping.

Origins

The first known Christmas Club started in 1909, when Merkel Landis, treasurer of the Carlisle Trust Company of Carlisle (Pennsylvania), introduced the first Christmas savings fund. The Club attracted 350 customers who saved about $28 each, and the money was disbursed on December 1 of that year. 

The January 2, 1920 edition of the Belvidere, Illinois Daily Republican announced that the town's State Farmers Bank was encouraging parents to enroll their children in the Christmas Banking Club "to develop self-reliance and the saving habit".

Promotion
For decades, financial institutions competed for the holiday savings business, offering enticing premiums and advertising items such as tokens. The Dime Saving Bank of Toledo, Ohio, issued a brass token "good for 25 cents in opening a Christmas account" for 1922–1923. There were also numbered tokens issued by the Atlantic Country Trust Co. in Atlantic City, New Jersey, inscribed on the reverse: "Join our Christmas Club and Have Money When You Need It Most." In the February 2006 issue of Forbes magazine, business writer James Surowiecki summarized the accounts' appeal: "The popularity of Christmas Club accounts isn't a mystery; if their money was in a regular account, people assumed they'd spend it."

Drawbacks
Key drawbacks of Christmas Club accounts included low interest rates and a high number of restrictions, such as not allowing withdrawals unless fees were paid. Christmas Clubs later fell out of favor with consumers.

Banks also incurred high costs in maintaining the accounts. According to Dennis Halpin, the CEO for the Capital Communications Federal Credit Union, the union had 3,500 Christmas Club members in 1984. Each member required a check to be produced, signed, collated, and mailed, only for 70 percent to be returned to the bank to be deposited in another account.

See also 

 Dynamic inconsistency - a theoretic model explaining the utility of costly savings devices such as Christmas clubs.

References

Notes

Citations

Bibliography

External links
 First Reliance Christmas Club Flyer, February 25, 2016

Banking
Christmas economics
Christmas organizations